Mendi Muruks are a Papua New Guinea semi-professional rugby league football club representing Mendi in the Southern Highlands Province of Papua New Guinea. The club's logo features a "muruk", or cassowary. Although originally from Mendi in the Southern Highlands of Papua New Guinea, the team is currently based in Lae due to the current franchise owners. SBS (Structural Building Systems). They have held the Intercity premiership for 4 years in which the first Premiership win was in 1996 and then 10 years later they held the Cup for 3 years from 2006, 2007 and 2008.

2022 squad

Honours

League
PNGNRL Digicel Cup
Winners (4): 1996, 2006, 2007, 2008,
Runners up (4): 1995, 1998, 2010, 2012,

See also

References

Papua New Guinean rugby league teams